The William Bostick House is a historic building located at 115 North Gilbert Street in Iowa City, Iowa.

Description and history 
William H. Bostick, who built this house in 1851, is credited with constructing the first brick building in the city. The two-story structure is a  vernacular high style Greek Revival. The decorative elements were kept to a minimum. It features limestone lintels, a low-pitched hipped roof, an Arts and Crafts style porch with a balustrade of turned spindles, and a simple entablature across the top. The bricks and stonework have long been painted. It is believed the building served as an early city hall here and as a recruitment center for Civil War regiments. While the house has always been on this lot, it was moved to its current location further back on the lot in 1908. The present porch was added at that time.

The house was individually listed on the National Register of Historic Places in 1996. In 2004 it was included as a contributing property in the Jefferson Street Historic District.

References

Houses completed in 1851
Greek Revival houses in Iowa
Houses in Iowa City, Iowa
National Register of Historic Places in Iowa City, Iowa
Houses on the National Register of Historic Places in Iowa
Individually listed contributing properties to historic districts on the National Register in Iowa